The Basketball Champions League Top Scorer is the annual award that is given to the professional club basketball league, the Basketball Champions League (BCL)'s Top Scorer throughout the Champions League season. The  Basketball Champions League is the European-wide 3rd-tier level league. It is the European-wide league that is two tier levels below the European top-tier level EuroLeague, and one tier level below the EuroCup.

Top scorers

References

External links
Basketball Champions League (official website)
FIBA (official website)

Basketball Champions League awards and honors